Chandalash Game Reserve (also Сандалаш Sandalash) is a wildlife refuge in Kyrgyzstan. It is situated on the upper course of the river Chandalash, in Chatkal District.

References
 

Game reserves in Kyrgyzstan
Protected areas established in 1975